The following is a list of the monastic houses in Herefordshire, England.

See also
 List of monastic houses in England
 List of monastic houses in Wales

Notes

References

Medieval sites in England
Herefordshire
Lists of buildings and structures in Herefordshire
Herefordshire